Shemeti is a rural locality (a selo) in Dobryansky District, Perm Krai, Russia. The population was 99 as of 2010. There are 5 streets.

Geography 
Shemeti is located 23 km southwest of Dobryanka (the district's administrative centre) by road. Kamsky is the nearest rural locality.

References 

Rural localities in Dobryansky District